Dmitri Megalinsky, sometimes listed as Dmitry Megalinsky, (born April 15, 1985) is a Russian professional ice hockey defenceman who is currently an unrestricted free agent. He most recently played for HC Kunlun Red Star in the Kontinental Hockey League (KHL). He previously played with Severstal Cherepovets of the KHL. He was selected by Ottawa Senators in the 6th round (186th overall) of the 2005 NHL Entry Draft.

Career statistics

Regular season and playoffs

International

External links

1985 births
Living people
Avtomobilist Yekaterinburg players
HC Khimik Voskresensk players
HC Kunlun Red Star players
Lokomotiv Yaroslavl players
Metallurg Novokuznetsk players
Ottawa Senators draft picks
Russian ice hockey defencemen
Severstal Cherepovets players
HC Spartak Moscow players
TuTo players
HC Vityaz players
Sportspeople from Perm, Russia